Chinese Taipei competed at the 2016 Winter Youth Olympics in Lillehammer, Norway from 12 to 21 February 2016.

Alpine skiing

Girls

Ice hockey

Luge

Chinese Taipei qualified one boy.

Boys

Skeleton

See also
Chinese Taipei at the 2016 Summer Olympics

References

2016 in Taiwanese sport
Nations at the 2016 Winter Youth Olympics
Chinese Taipei at the Youth Olympics